Protect formerly Public Concern at Work (PCaW) is a whistleblowing charity operating in the United Kingdom. Established in 1993, Public Concern at Work advises individuals with whistleblowing dilemmas at work, supports organisations with their whistleblowing arrangements and informs public policy and seeks legislative change.

In 2013, the organisation celebrated its 20th anniversary.

Publications

Reports
The UK Whistleblowing Report, October 2014
The report of the Whistleblowing Commission on the effectiveness of existing arrangements for workplace whistleblowing in the UK, November 2013
Whistleblowing: The Inside Story, May 2013
Whistleblowing: Beyond the law, October 2011
Where's whistleblowing now? Ten years of legal protection for whistleblowers, March 2010

See also
 Government Accountability Project, an American equivalent
 Federal Accountability Initiative for Reform, a Canadian equivalent

References

External links
 Official Website | Public Concern at Work
 Whistleblowing International Network, the international whistleblowing network of NGOs working to support and protect workplace whistleblowing around the world

Charities based in London
1993 establishments in the United Kingdom